Imperial Valley College is a public community college in Imperial County, California. It was founded in 1962 and enrolls around 7,000 students per year. In April 2022, Lennor M. Johnson, Ed.D., was appointed president of the college. The main campus is located on a  site in the city of Imperial with extended campuses in El Centro and Brawley.

History
The Imperial Valley College had its beginning on May 9, 1922, with the name of Central Junior College, opening in September that year. Originally at Central Union High School, two years later a new college named Brawley Junior College was opened. Brawley Junior College had to close in 1947 due to lack of attendance. Because of this, Central Junior College was now receiving students from all over the Imperial Valley; students and faculty wanted to change the school name to a more representative one. The Board of Trustees officially changed to Imperial Valley College in late 1951. The college remained housed on the campus of Central Union High School in El Centro until the governance of the college was changed in 1959.

The Imperial Community College District was formed by a vote of the electorate in 1959 and a  bond issue then authorized construction of a new campus on a  parcel at Aten Road and Highway 111.

A ground-breaking service was held, October 2, 1961, for the new college campus. Meanwhile, due to the lack of space, IVC moved from El Centro to a temporary site in Imperial, on the campus of Imperial High School. The new campus opened for students in September 1962.

Mascot
Because of the desert location, the mascot "Arabs" was chosen.  However, the college's leadership has intermittently considered changing this because the mascot has become a distraction for athletic teams traveling out of the Valley.  An unsuccessful push to change the mascot was launched during the spring 2009 academic semester.  In October 2020, after a Town Hall meeting to consider the matter, featuring vociferous community and student objection to retaining the "Arabs" mascot,  the Board of Trustees voted to change the school mascot, with a new mascot due to be unveiled in 2023.

References

External links
 Official website

Sources
 Henderson, Tracey. Imperial Valley. Neyenesch, 1968.

Schools in Imperial County, California
California Community Colleges
Brawley, California
El Centro, California
El Centro metropolitan area
Imperial Valley
Schools accredited by the Western Association of Schools and Colleges
Educational institutions established in 1962
1962 establishments in California